Manisuris is a genus of Indian plants in the grass family. The only known species is Manisuris myurus, native to Tamil Nadu in Southern India.

Formerly included species
Numerous species are now regarded as better suited in other genera, including Chasmopodium, Coelorachis, Glyphochloa, Hackelochloa, Hemarthria, Heteropholis, Lasiurus, Mnesithea, Phacelurus, Rhytachne, and Rottboellia. These species include:
 Manisuris exaltata, valid as Rottboellia cochinchinensis

References

Andropogoneae
Endemic flora of India (region)
Monotypic Poaceae genera